Pseudoclanis zairensis is a moth of the  family Sphingidae. It is known from the Democratic Republic of Congo.

References

Pseudoclanis
Moths described in 2007